Buckabank is a small village in the English county of Cumbria. In 1870-72 the township had a population of 617.

The village has a very small population and only consists of a few houses; because of this it is often referred to as part of Dalston.

References

External links

Dalston village website
Description and photos of Buckabank and Dalston

Villages in Cumbria
Dalston, Cumbria